Jan Kazimierz Osiński (24 March 1975 – 10 April 2010) was a Polish Roman Catholic priest. He was Vice-Chancellor of the Curia of the Military Ordinariate.

He died in the 2010 Polish Air Force Tu-154 crash near Smolensk on 10 April 2010. He was posthumously awarded the Order of Polonia Restituta.

References

1975 births
2010 deaths
Cardinal Stefan Wyszyński University in Warsaw alumni
Polish Roman Catholic priests
Knights of the Order of Polonia Restituta
Victims of the Smolensk air disaster